Linda is a 1993 American made-for-television crime drama film based on a novella by John D. MacDonald. It is the second adaptation of that work.

Plot summary

Two couples, the Cowleys (Paul and Linda) and the Jeffries (Brandon and Stella), have been friends for about a year. They spend so much time together they decide to vacation together in Florida. Jeff and Linda are secretly having an affair. They spend so much time together that their spouses become suspicious. Events spiral out of control.  Linda decides to speed up Brandon's vow about "till death us do part" by shooting Stella dead with his consent.  But Paul, who also gets shot, isn't going down so easily.  The one innocent person is then framed for murder but luckily finds an ally in a local police officer who is determined to expose the truth.

Cast
 Virginia Madsen as Linda Cowley
 Richard Thomas as Paul Cowley
 Ted McGinley as Brandon "Jeff" Jeffries
 Laura Harrington as Stella Jeffries
 T.E. Russell as David Hill
 J. Don Ferguson as Davis Vernon
 Richard K. Olsen as Journeyman
 David Dwyer as Dike Matthews
 Michael Goodwin as Carl Shepp
 Maria Howell as Shirley
 Vito Mirabella as Vito

References

External links

1993 television films
1993 films
1993 crime drama films
American crime drama films
Crime films based on actual events
USA Network original films
Films based on works by John D. MacDonald
Films scored by David Michael Frank
American drama television films
1990s American films